Block Shit is a collaborative album by Bay-Area rappers Yukmouth and Tha Gamblaz, released on November 13, 2001.

Track listing
 "World Domination" (featuring Get Low Playaz)
 "Block Shit" (featuring Phats Bossalini, Dru Down, Mac Mall & Troopa)
 "Never Let Em See You Sweat"
 "Callin' Shots"
 "Fuck The Ice" (featuring JT Tha Bigga Figga)
 "Buckle Up" (featuring Phats Bossalini & Dru Down)
 "Trying 2 Survive" (featuring La Joi)
 "Jim Hats" (featuring Keak Da Sneak & Numskull)
 "Tryna Bubble" (featuring Dirty Red)
 "Suckas"
 "Thug Niggas" (featuring Phats Bossalini)
 "Real Shit"

References
 Amazon.com
 Audiolunchbox.com

2001 albums
Yukmouth albums
Collaborative albums